Marvin George Westmore (December 24, 1934 – November 28, 2020) was an American make-up artist in Hollywood, and part of the famed Westmore family. The son of Monte Westmore, he ran the Westmore Academy and was the Founder & CEO of the George Westmore Research Library & Museum in Burbank, California. His body frame and clothing styles were said to resemble that of The Price Is Right  announcer Rod Roddy, and he played a Rod Roddy impersonator in a showcase on the January 11, 1994 episode of the game show. He died in November 2020 at the age of 85.

Selected filmography

 Dr. Dolittle
 The Buddy Holly Story
 Blade Runner
 The Best Little Whorehouse in Texas
 MacGyver
 Vegas Vacation

See also

Westmore family

References

External links
 Frank Westmore and Muriel Davidson. The Westmores of Hollywood. Lippincott, Philadelphia, 1976.
 
 George Westmore Research Library & Museum
 Westmore Academy of Cosmetic Arts "The First Name in Makeup Education"

1934 births
2020 deaths
American make-up artists
Marvin